A feminist blog presents the issues of feminism through a blog. Feminist blogs serve the purpose of spreading ideas, sparking debates, raising awareness, discussing opinions, sharing stories, and virtually spreading the notion of feminism throughout the Internet.

Feministing consciously includes differing types of blogs, news sources, and organizations providing the site’s commitment to diversity in all aspects.

Impact on feminism
These blogs have also empowered women in the media field, which still remains largely male dominated.

Global impact

With feminist blogging, women can have a voice to speak up about their opinions and beliefs. This also allows them to openly discuss about their situation with confidence and can help avoid being seen as silent or submissive. By blogging, it is seen as an effective method in getting the involvement of others or getting the attention of politically active people. With women discussing about events confidently, it allows a community of like minded individuals to understand what is occurring around the world and how they can get involved with different issues. With blogging, there is empowerment to make a difference within governments and international communities by getting involved through blogging. Feminist blogging is seen as a public activity that allows anyone to see a situation from a different viewpoint. Unlike traditional forms of media that discusses situations through a specific view that may appear to be male influence or avoids discussing about it, the information through feminist blogs is seen as transparent rather than edited for appeal.

With feminist blogging, there is an increase in activism. While many critics argue that nothing gets accomplished, feminist blogging encourages activism. Women use blogging as a method to get information and understanding of concepts or issues. Feminist blogging allows an individual who is in a community that does not understand or have much knowledge of the issues that many women go through. So, it allows individuals to get the information that many news resources may not cover and allows individuals to see through a difference perspective gaze. The gaze is not through a Western perspective, but rather a perspective of women living in that country with different cultural beliefs than Western societies. With women blogging about their opinions and hardships they endure, their personal problems become political and international as well.

Feminist blogging can be seen as an essential method in the democratization of women through online activism. 

Feminist blogging allows individuals to understand that activism in the modern era has changed. It allows individuals to incorporate social issues, such as feminism, into political activism and, allows for people to discover different forms of feminist theories.

Types of feminist blogs
There are many different types of feminist blogs on the Internet. Some of the most common types of feminist blogs include: Personal, Topical, Collaborative, Political, Corporate, and Advice.

Through Feministing, feminism ideologies of the third-wave era conjoins with political activism to substantially reshape the way in which we look at political discourse. conventional political discourse. Feministing aims at creating awareness and serving as a platform open for blogger commentary on an array of political issues.

Rules
Different feminist blogs have different rules for participating in the discussion boards and comment boxes. Feminist blogs aim to keep a neutral yet expressive atmosphere in the blog realm since many discussed issues can be very controversial.

Criticism
Since blogging is part of the World Wide Web, the atmosphere is not always positive. People of any standpoint can express their opinions and voice their thoughts on specific topics. Blogging can be dangerous in terms of discussing some controversial feminist issues such as abortion etc. because the environment is open to anyone, it can become very opinionated and discriminatory.

References

 
Feminist literature